Sigfrid Larsson (1 January 1882 – 9 October 1968) was a Swedish diver. He competed in two events at the 1908 Summer Olympics.

References

External links
 

1882 births
1968 deaths
Swedish male divers
Olympic divers of Sweden
Divers at the 1906 Intercalated Games
Divers at the 1908 Summer Olympics
Divers from Stockholm
20th-century Swedish people